Hod HaSharon (lit. "Splendor of the Sharon plain") is a city in the Central District of Israel.

Hod HaSharon was officially formed and made a local council in 1964 by the merging of four moshavot:  Magdiel, Ramatayim, Hadar, and Ramat Hadar.

History

Before the 20th century, the area of Hod HaSharon formed part of the Forest of Sharon, a hallmark of the region's historical landscape. It was an open woodland dominated by Mount Tabor Oak (Quercus ithaburensis), which extended from Kfar Yona in the north to Ra'anana in the south. The local Arab inhabitants traditionally used the area for pasture, firewood and intermittent cultivation. The intensification of settlement and agriculture in the coastal plain during the 19th century led to deforestation and subsequent environmental degradation known from Hebrew sources.

Hod HaSharon was created in 1964 through a merger of Magdiel with Hadar Ramatayim, an administrative body which encompassed the former moshavot of Ramatayim, Hadar and Ramat Hadar. Hod Hasharon was governed by a local council until it was declared a city in April 1990.

A 1,300 year old olive oil factory of mason-worked blocks was unearthed in Hod Hasharon. The leader of the excavation team Durar Masarwa stated, "We discovered the surface on which olive oil was extracted as well as a network of pipes, canals and holes that drained the liquid oil."

Magdiel
Magdiel was founded on August 2, 1924 by a group of 12 Ashkenazi families. They received a plot of land from Yehoshua Hankin which they cultivated and prepared for farming. Magdiel was established as a moshava, starting on 4,000 dunams of land purchased near the Arab village of Biyar 'Adas. The initial population included Jewish immigrants from Russia, Poland and Lithuania, later joined by a group from the Netherlands.<ref>Encyclopedia Judaica, Keter Publishing House, Jerusalem, 1972, Vol. 8, p. 802, "Hod Ha-Sharon"</ref>

Ramatayim

Ramatayim was founded in July 1925 by immigrants from Poland. It was founded on the principle of private initiative. Ramatayim was built on two hills connected by a valley, hence the name Ramatayim, literally 'two hills'. 
According to a census conducted in 1931 by the British Mandate authorities, Ramatayim had a population of 180, in 31 houses. In 1949, Ramatayim became the first local council to be established in Israel.

Hadar
Hadar was established in 1927 by Yael Leah Eichhorn, a middle-class immigrant from Eastern Europe, who was joined soon after by a group of Italian Jews. The land was purchased from the Abou Kishk Bedouin tribe.  The pioneers decided to build a rural settlement based on citrus crops (hence the village's name, "Hadar" being Hebrew for "citrus"). In its early years, the farmers of Hadar also engaged in poultry farming. According to the 1931 census Hadar had 71 inhabitants, all Jews, in 23 houses. In the early 1940s, Yemenite immigrants moved to Hadar, establishing the Shikun Hateymanim quarter, today part of the Gannei Tzvi neighborhood. In 1951, Ramatayim and Hadar merged to form Hadar Ramatayim. In April 1956, the boundaries of Hadar Ramatayim were extended to include the ma'abara of Ganei Tzvi, established in the end of 1948 Arab–Israeli War as Kfar Nitzahon'', and renamed earlier in 1956 after Lord Harry (Tzvi) Morris of Kenwood, a major donor of the Jewish National Fund.

Ramat Hadar
Ramat Hadar was established in December 1938 by middle-class immigrants from Nazi Germany, members of the Fifth Aliyah. Ramat Hadar was built on a hill south of Hadar, near the main road from Petah Tikva to Ramatayim (nowadays road 402). The economy of Ramat Hadar was based on small farms, mainly poultry farming, and citrus orchards. Ramat Hadar had its own post office between 1959 and 1989. In 1963, Ramat Hadar became part of Hadar Ramatayim.

Demographics
In 2006, the ethnic makeup of the city was 99.9% Jewish, with no significant Arab population. The population density of Hod HaSharon is the lowest in the Sharon Plain. The population growth rate in 2006 was 3.3%. According to the CBS, there were 18,612 salaried workers and 2,006 are self-employed in the city.

Schools and religious institutions

According to the CBS, there are 18 schools and 8,083 students in the city: 
12 elementary schools: The Democratic School, HaMagen, Yigal Alon, Lapid, Shilo, Mamlachti Alef, Neve Ne'eman, Rabin, Re'ut, Tali, Ha'Yarok in the name of Ariel Sharon, and Begin (4,406 students).
4 middle schools: HaRishonim, HaShachar, Atidim and Tzurim (1,628 students). A fifth middle school, HaShkimim opened in 2018.
5 high schools: Hadarim, Alexander Muss High School in Israel, Ramon, Mosenson and Na'amat (2,049 students). 
71.7% of the city's 12th graders were entitled to a matriculation certificate in 2001.

Mosenson Youth Village accepts both Israelis and overseas students. The  Alexander Muss High School in Israel offers a program for American high school students who spend two months to a year in Israel. Each year approximately half of the tenth grade class from the Milken Community High School in Los Angeles, CA, come to Hod Hasharon to study for a semester along with this program.

Transport
Hod HaSharon is roughly bounded by Highway 531 in the north, Highway 40 in the east, Highway 5 in the south and Highway 4 in the west. Road 402 runs through the city. The city is served by two railway stations, Hod HaSharon Sokolov and Kfar Sava Nordau.

Hod Hasharon Park
 is a park in southern Hod Hasharon. The park contains a hill, which was formerly used as the municipal landfill of Hod Hasharon, and is now used as a hiking and observation area of the park. From the top of the hill, also known as "Sustainability hill", one can  see Hod Hasharon, the settlements of the Drom HaSharon Regional Council, Tel Aviv, Herzliya and Samaria.

Near the hill, the largest ecological lake in Israel was established, with an area of 27 acres. Near the lake, there is a variety of waterfowl, herons, geese, ducks and songbirds. In the water. African softshell turtles, nutria and fish of various types have been observed.

Twin towns – sister cities

Hod HaSharon is twinned with:
 Dorsten, Germany

Notable people

Adi Altschuler (born 1986), educator and a social entrepreneur
Ron Arad (born 1958), Israeli Air Force weapon systems officer; classified as missing in action since 1986
Danny Ayalon (born 1955), politician and former Israeli ambassador to the United States
Netta Barzilai (born 1993), singer, winner of the Eurovision Song Contest in 
Shahar Biran (born 1998), tennis player
Dor Daniel (born 1982), singer-songwriter
Gedalia Gal (born 1933), farmer and former politician and member of the Israeli Knesset
Eliran George (born 1992), footballer
Shira Haas (born 1995), actress
Keren Hadar (born 1975), soprano singer
Yifat Kariv (born 1973), member of the Israeli Knesset and social worker
Keren Leibovitch (born 1973), champion Paralympic swimmer
Yaniv Luzon (born 1981), footballer
Noam Mills (born 1986), female Israeli Olympic fencer
Bar Refaeli (born 1985), model and actress
Udi Spielman (born 1951), singer and Chazzan
Ehud "Udi" Tenenbaum (born 1979), software cracker, also known as The Analyzer
Avihai Yadin (born 1986), footballer
Imri Ziv (born 1991), singer

References

External links

Official municipal website 
Official Youth Council website 

 
Cities in Central District (Israel)
Cities in Israel
Sharon plain